Randers FC is a Danish professional football team based in Randers, which plays in the top-flight Danish Superliga championship. During the 2016–17 campaign they will be competing in the following competitions: Superliga, DBU Pokalen.

Competitions

Superliga

External links
 Official site
 News about Randers FC
 Statistics site

Randers FC
Randers